Fubulume Inyama (born 25 July 1959) is a Congolese boxer. He competed in the men's light middleweight event at the 1984 Summer Olympics.

References

External links
 

1959 births
Living people
Democratic Republic of the Congo male boxers
Olympic boxers of the Democratic Republic of the Congo
Boxers at the 1984 Summer Olympics
Place of birth missing (living people)
Light-middleweight boxers
21st-century Democratic Republic of the Congo people